Montjean is a commune in the Mayenne department in north-western France.

Geography
The river Oudon flows through the middle of the commune and crosses the village of Montjean.

See also
Communes of Mayenne

References

Communes of Mayenne